Montvale is a census-designated place (CDP) in Bedford County, Virginia, United States. The population as of the 2020 census was 635. The community is located between Roanoke and Bedford. It is part of the Lynchburg Metropolitan Statistical Area.

History
Locust Level was listed on the National Register of Historic Places in 1990.

Geography
According to the United States Census Bureau, the CDP has a total area of 2.416 square miles (6.257 km²).

Demographics

2020 census
As of the census of 2020, there were 635 people residing in the CDP. There were 313 housing units. The racial makeup of the CDP was 93.4% White, 4.7% African American or Black, 0.3% American Indian, 0.6% Asian, 0.0% Pacific Islander, 0.0% from other races, and 1.0% from two or more races. Hispanic or Latino of any race were 1.0% of the population.

Government
The United States Postal Service operates the Montvale Post Office within the CDP, although portions of the area have a Blue Ridge ZIP code.

Law enforcement is provided by the Bedford County Sheriff's Office. Fire protection is provided by the Montvale Volunteer Fire Department, which operates a fire station within the CDP. Emergency medical services are provided by the Montvale Volunteer Rescue Squad, which also operates from a station within the CDP.

Education
The CDP is served by Bedford County Public Schools. Public school students residing in Montvale are zoned to attend Montvale Elementary School, Liberty Middle School, and Liberty High School. 

A branch campus of Central Virginia Community College in nearby Bedford is the closest higher education institution to the CDP.

Transportation

Air
The Roanoke-Blacksburg Regional Airport is the closest airport with commercial service to the CDP.

Highways
 US Route 221
 US Route 460

Rail
A Norfolk Southern rail line runs through the CDP. The closest passenger rail service is located in Roanoke.

References

Census-designated places in Bedford County, Virginia